Ctenuchidia agrius is a moth of the subfamily Arctiinae. It was described by Johan Christian Fabricius in 1781. It is found in Suriname.

References

Arctiinae
Moths described in 1781